Strathaven North railway station served Flemington, a neighbourhood of Strathaven in Scotland, from 1863 to 1904 on the Hamilton and Strathaven Railway.

History 
The station was opened as Strathaven on 2 February 1863 by the Hamilton and Strathaven Railway. Despite its name, it was situated closer to Flemington than Strathaven. It had a goods yard on the west, a locomotive shed to the east and a signal box, which opened in 1893 and closed in 1904. The station's name was changed on 4 July 1904 to Strathaven North. It was replaced by a newer station of the same name situated a short distance further east on 1 October 1904. The old station became a goods yard called Flemington with a few extra sidings. The locomotive shed closed. The site is now a housing estate.

References

External liks
Strathaven Flemington at RailScot

Disused railway stations in South Lanarkshire
Railway stations in Great Britain opened in 1863
Railway stations in Great Britain closed in 1904
1863 establishments in Scotland
1904 disestablishments in Scotland
Strathaven